The Museum of Printing (MoP), located in Haverhill, Massachusetts, is a museum dedicated to preserving the history of printing technologies and practices, the graphic arts, and their role in the development of culture and literacy.

History
In 1978, a group of New England printers and publishers mobilized to preserve hot metal typesetting equipment which was being replaced by the Boston Globe newspaper. For the first 18 years, the growing collection was dispersed in various warehouses and spaces inaccessible to the public. In 1997, some of the collection was first opened to view in space formerly occupied by the Textile Museum in North Andover, Massachusetts. In 2016, Rochester Institute of Technology Professor Emeritus Frank Romano acquired and donated a former electrical supplies building in Haverhill, Massachusetts to house the museum.

The core of the collection was contributed by Romano, who spent his career in the development of the modern printing business. He contributed 6,000 books from his personal library, plus many classic machines, including early Macintosh desktop publishing computers contributed by Steve Jobs.

The typewriter collection has been the setting and facilitator of at least one successful marriage proposal, in 2020.

Collection
The displays include a number of historic machines and related artifacts:
Early Gutenberg-style hand-powered printing presses, progressing to small hand-operated presses used in the early 20th century
Linotype "hot metal" typecasting machine
Xerox 914 photocopier, mimeographs, spirit duplicators, and blueprint copiers
Typewriters, including composing typewriters such as the IBM Selectric Composer
A complex mechanical Chinese typewriter with thousands of characters
Photolithography and hand-engraving equipment
Bindery, finishing, and mailing equipment
A full-size drum scanner
Phototypesetters (claimed to be the largest collection in the world)
Desktop publishing setups such as the original Apple Macintosh and Laserwriter printer
Various data storage media used with printing, such as magnetic tape, floppy disks, and specialized optical cartridges
Many different metal, optical, digital, and wood typefonts, including over 2500 wooden display fonts

There is an extensive library of 7,000 books, periodicals, and media related to the history of paper and printing.

Programs
Operation of classic printing equipment is demonstrated, as well as exhibitions and hands-on workshops by artists who use printing technologies. In 2018, the museum celebrated a "QWERTY" Festival, featuring typewriters and their history and culture.

There are art galleries, meeting spaces, and a museum store on premises. The store offers books, souvenirs, and classic printing artifacts.

Gallery

References

External links
Official site

Buildings and structures in Haverhill, Massachusetts
Printing in the United States
Industry museums in Massachusetts
Museums in Essex County, Massachusetts
Printing museums in the United States